The Revolutionary Communist Party (Organizing Committees) (abbr. RCP(OC)) was a Canada-based communist organization advocating the overthrow of the capitalist system. The ideology of the organization, founded in 2000, can be regarded as anti-revisionist in character. It described its ideology as "Marxism-Leninism-Maoism", which it considered the third phase of Marxism. The group did not take part in electoral politics, instead aiming to educate the working class about the need for a revolution in the style of the Russian and Chinese revolutions. The RCP(OC) was non-collaborationist and opposed all Canadian political parties, including those calling themselves communist. The RCP(OC) considered all current political parties in Canada to be reformist and therefore non-revolutionary by nature. Likewise, they also regarded the bureaucratic leaderships of the unions as collaborating with the bourgeoisie in an effort to undermine the revolutionary struggle of working class.

The RCP(OC) worked closely with a communist youth organization, the Red Youth Front, which held its founding meeting in Montreal in November 2005.

Canadian Revolutionary Congress 
In November 2006, the RCP(OC) held its first national congress, the Canadian Revolutionary Congress, in Montreal, Quebec. At this congress the RCP(OC) put forward a resolution to support the founding of the RCP proper. The resolution was supported by the majority of the  participants, and the RCP(OC) re-formed itself as the Revolutionary Communist Party of Canada. The words "of Canada" are not officially part of its name, but are included to differentiate the Canadian RCP from the Revolutionary Communist Party USA.

Defunct Maoist parties
Anti-revisionist organizations
Maoist organizations in Canada
Communist parties in Canada
Far-left politics in Canada
2000 establishments in Canada
2006 disestablishments in Canada